Willem Gerardus "Wim" Anderiesen (27 November 1903 – 18 July 1944) was a Dutch footballer.

Club career
Born in Amsterdam, he played for Romein and 't Gooi before being admitted to Ajax, where he would play from 1925 to 1940, winning five national titles.

International career
He also earned 46 caps for the Netherlands national football team, and participated in the 1934 and 1938 World Cups.

Personal life
He was married to Trijntje Huizinga and had three children.

Aside from football, he was employed as typographer, police officer and doorman.

He died in 1944 from pneumonia. His son, Wim Anderiesen Jr., also played for Ajax in the 1950s and died in January 2017, aged 85.

References

1903 births
1944 deaths
Footballers from Amsterdam
Association football midfielders
Dutch footballers
Netherlands international footballers
AFC Ajax players
1934 FIFA World Cup players
1938 FIFA World Cup players
Dutch police officers
Deaths from pneumonia in the Netherlands
SC 't Gooi players